PETases are an esterase class of enzymes that catalyze the hydrolysis of polyethylene terephthalate (PET) plastic to monomeric mono-2-hydroxyethyl terephthalate (MHET). The idealized chemical reaction is (where n is the number of monomers in the polymer chain):
(ethylene terephthalate)n + H2O → (ethylene terephthalate)n-1 + MHET
Trace amount of the PET breaks down to bis(2-hydroxyethyl) terephthalate (BHET). PETases can also break down PEF-plastic (polyethylene-2,5-furandicarboxylate), which is a bioderived PET replacement, into the analogous . PETases can't catalyze the hydrolysis of aliphatic polyesters like polybutylene succinate or polylactic acid.

Non-enzymatic natural degradation of PET will take hundreds of years, but PETases can degrade PET in matter of days.

History
The first PETase was discovered in 2016 from Ideonella sakaiensis strain 201-F6 bacteria found from sludge samples collected close to a Japanese PET bottle recycling site. Other types of PET degrading hydrolases have been known before this discovery. These include hydrolases such as lipases, esterases, and cutinases. Discoveries of polyester degrading enzymes date at least as far back as 1975 (α-chymotrypsin) and 1977 (lipase) for example.

PET plastic was put into widespread use in the 1970s and it has been suggested that PETases in bacteria evolved only recently. PETase may have had past enzymatic activity associated with degradation of a waxy coating on plants.

Structure 
As of April 2019, there were 17 known three-dimensional crystal structures of PETases: 6QGC, 6ILX, 6ILW, 5YFE, 6EQD, 6EQE, 6EQF, 6EQG, 6EQH, 6ANE, 5XJH, 5YNS, 5XFY, 5XFZ, 5XG0, 5XH2 and 5XH3.

PETase exhibits shared qualities with both lipases and cutinases in that it possesses an α/β-hydrolase fold; although, the active-site cleft observed in PETase is more open than in cutinases. The Ideonella sakaiensis PETase is similar to dienelactone hydrolase, according to Pfam. According to ESTHER, it falls into the Polyesterase-lipase-cutinase family.

There are approximately 69 PETase-like enzymes comprising a variety of diverse organisms, and there are two classifications of these enzymes including type I and type II. It is suggested that 57 enzymes fall into the type I category whereas the rest fall into the type II group, including the PETase enzyme found in the Ideonella sakaiensis. Within all 69 PETase-like enzymes, there exists the same three residues within the active site, suggesting that the catalytic mechanism is the same in all forms of PETase-like enzymes.

Mutations
In 2018 scientists from the University of Portsmouth with the collaboration of the National Renewable Energy Laboratory of the United States Department of Energy developed a mutant of this PETase that degrades PET faster than the one in its natural state. In this study it was also shown that PETases can degrade polyethylene 2,5-furandicarboxylate (PEF). 

Studies have demonstrated that  the β1-β2 connecting loop located far from the active site of PETase of I. sakaiensis (IsPETase) structure is very flexible it isuggested that it can be considered for mutagenesis to increase the thermal stability of IsPETase.

Biological pathway 

In I. sakaiensis, the resultant MHET is further broken down by the action of MHETase enzyme to terephthalic acid and ethylene glycol. Laboratory experiments showed that chimeric proteins that artificially link a MHETase and a PETase outperform similar mixtures of free enzymes.

See also 

Organisms breaking down plastic
Galleria mellonella, a caterpillar that can digest polyethylene.
Aspergillus tubingensis, a fungus that can digest polyurethane.
Pestalotiopsis microspora, an endophytic fungus species able to break down polyurethane.
cutinase, an esterase enzyme of similar geometric shape

References 

Hydrolases
Recycling